ARX was an unreleased Mach-like operating system written in Modula-2+ developed by Acorn Computers Ltd in the Acorn Research Centre (ARC) United Kingdom (UK) and later by Olivetti - which purchased Acorn - for Acorn's new Archimedes personal computers based on the ARM architecture reduced instruction set computer (RISC) central processing unit (CPUs).

Overview
According to the project Application Manager Richard Cownie, during the project, while Acorn was developing the kernel, it used the C and Acorn Modula Execution Library (CAMEL) in the  Acorn Extended Modula-2 (AEM2) compiler (ported from Modula-2 ETH Zurich (ETH) using Econet hardware). Though never released externally, CAMEL was ported to use on Sun Microsystems Unix computers. In an effort to port Sun's workstations Sun NeWS to the Archimedes, David Chase developed a compiler based on AEM2 for the programming language Modula-3.

ARX was a preemptive multitasking, multithreading, multi-user operating system. Much of the OS ran in user mode and as a result suffered performance problems due to switches into kernel mode to perform mutexes, which led to the introduction of the SWP instruction to the instruction set of the ARMv2a version of the ARM processor. It had support of a file system for optical (write once read many (WORM)) disks and featured a window system, a window toolkit (and a direct manipulation user interface (UI) editor) and an Interscript-based text editor, for enriched documents written in Interpress (a HTML precursor). The OS had to be fitted in a 512 KB read-only memory (ROM) ROM image. This suggests that ARX had a microkernel-type design.

It was not finished in time to be used in the Acorn Archimedes range of computers, which shipped in 1987 with an operating system named Arthur, later renamed RISC OS, derived from the earlier Machine Operating System (MOS) from Acorn's earlier 8-bit BBC Micro range. Confusion persisted about the nature of ARX amongst the wider public and press, with some believing that ARX was Acorn's own Unix variant, with this view being refined in time to accommodate ARX as Acorn's own attempt to deliver a "UNIX look-alike" whose development had been abandoned in favour of a traditional Unix version for the Archimedes, which ultimately emerged as RISC iX.

The Acorn Research Centre was acquired by Olivetti.

See also
 RISC iX

References

External links
 ARX features
 History of the addition of the SWP instruction to the ARM3 instruction set

Acorn operating systems
ARM operating systems
Discontinued operating systems
Microkernel-based operating systems
Microkernels